Alessi Bakery is a historic bakery and restaurant in Tampa, Florida. Offering desserts, sandwiches, soups, and breads, the family operated bakery has been in business for more than 100 years. It was founded in 1912 by Nicolo Alessi. The business is incorporated as Phil's Cake Box Bakeries. Take-out, dine-in and catering are offered. The bakery also sells wholesale and opened a $20 million 100,000-square-foot bakery plant off Waters Avenue in Town ’N Country, Florida in 2008. 

In 2012 the bakery filed for bankruptcy. It remains open.

In May 2018, the long-time owner of Alessi Bakery, Phil Alessi, died. He had inherited the business from his father, John Alessi, and had an instrumental role in the company's expansion, opening a 100,000 sq.ft. facility in Northwest Tampa to sell their products nationally.

References

1912 establishments in Florida
Bakeries of the United States
Companies that filed for Chapter 11 bankruptcy in 2012
Restaurants established in 1912
Restaurants in Tampa, Florida